Reeves (formerly Reeves Station) is an unincorporated community in Gordon County, in the U.S. state of Georgia.

History
A post office called Reeves Station was established in 1870, renamed Reeves in 1903, and closed in 1954. The community was named for Osborn Reeves, the original owner of the town site.

References

Unincorporated communities in Gordon County, Georgia
Unincorporated communities in Georgia (U.S. state)